The 2013–14 AJIHL season is the second season of the Australian Junior Ice Hockey League. It ran from 5 October 2013 until 1 March 2014, with the finals running from 8 March 2014 until 9 March 2014. The AJIHL is the highest Australian national junior ice hockey competition.

League business
On August 22, 2013 it was announced that the Melbourne Red Wings would change their name to the Melbourne Glaciers and the Melbourne Blackhawks would be renamed the Melbourne Whalers, which avoided the close resemblance with the Detroit Red Wings and Chicago Blackhawks of the NHL after the NHL had concerns over breaches of copyright and this allowed the team to develop its own brand identity.

In September 2013 the Sydney Maple Leafs and Sydney Lightning would follow suit with the Melbourne teams and also rename and rebrand their teams to the Sydney Wolf Pack and Sydney Sabres

In October 2013, two additional teams were added to the AJIHL from Perth, Western Australia. The new teams would be called the Perth Pelicans and the Perth Sharks. The season increased from 14 games to 15 games per season. Tryouts for the Perth teams began 2 September 2014

Regular season
The regular season began on 5 October 2013 and ran through to 1 March 2014 before the teams competed in the playoff series.

October

November

December

February

March

Standings
At the end of the regular season, the league standings were as follows:

Source

Player statistics

Scoring leaders
The following players led the league in regular season points.

Leading goaltenders

Playoffs

Final

References

External links
Ice Hockey Australia
AJIHL Coverage - Hewitt Sports

AJIHL
AJIHL
AJIHL
Australian Junior Ice Hockey League